Heiruspecs is a self-titled album by Saint Paul, Minnesota hip hop group Heiruspecs.  It was recorded at The Hideaway Studio in Minneapolis, with producer Joe Mabbott.  The album was released on December 13, 2008 at First Avenue.

There are several collaborations on the album.  The track "Sunshower" features Dan Wilson of Semisonic, and "Change Is Coming" features Dessa of Doomtree.  The album's first single is "Get Up," which discusses national divisions over an intense guitar riff.

Track listing
Without Much Sleep
Get Up
All In All
Interlude A
Let It Fly
Broken Record Feat. I Self Devine
Pay To Play
We Want A New Flow
Lenses Feat. Maria Isa
Slammin' Caprice Doors
Change Is Coming Feat. Dessa & New Mc
Ten Miles A Day
On My Way
Move With Me Feat. Mastermind
Interlude B
Sunshower Feat. Dan Wilson
The Pushback
Smash
Diy
Tongue Slingers Feat. Carnage
The Nguyens

References

2008 albums
Heiruspecs albums